In the Whyte notation for classifying the wheel arrangement of steam locomotives, an 0-8-8-0 is a locomotive with two sets of eight driving wheels and neither leading wheels nor trailing wheels.  Two sets of driving wheels would give far too long a wheelbase to be mounted in a fixed locomotive frame, so all 0-8-8-0s have been articulated locomotives of the Mallet type, whether simple or compound. In the UIC classification, this arrangement would be, refined to Mallet locomotives,  (D)D.  The type was sometimes called Angus in North America.

Other equivalent classifications are:
UIC classification: DD (also known as German classification and Italian classification)
French classification: 040+040
Turkish classification: 44+44
Swiss classification: 4/4+4/4

The lack of leading and trailing wheels to assist the tracking and stability of the locomotive means that the 0-8-8-0 type is not suited to high speeds.  The vast majority were used as very heavy switchers (generally for hump yard work), transfer locomotives for hauling cuts of cars between rail yards, or pushers for assistance on grades.

Most locomotives of this arrangement were built and served in North America, but there were exceptions.  The Bavarian State Railways (K.Bay.St.B) built a total of 25 0-8-8-0T tank locomotives of class Gt 2x4/4 between 1913 and 1923, classified after unification of Germany's railway systems as class BR96.  These worked trains over heavily graded stretches of line, mostly as bankers (US: pushers) and were the largest locomotives in Europe when introduced.

Popular culture
Used in Lionel O gauge only in Erie and Pennsylvania road names.

The Bavarian locomotives have been modelled in HO gauge by Marklin/Trix and by Rivarossi.

See also 
 Erie L-1 - the only articulated camelback locomotive

References

External links
Web Site of ToyTrains1 0-8-8-0 Angus Steam Locomotives
Erie Railroad L1 Class 0-8-8-0

 
88,0-8-8-0